Quyudərə Xəştab (also, Kuyudere Kheshtab and Guyudara Khashtab) is a village in the Zangilan Rayon of Azerbaijan.

References 

Populated places in Zangilan District